Trey Muse (born July 26, 1999) is an American professional soccer player who plays as a goalkeeper for USL Championship club Charleston Battery.

Career

College and Amateur
Muse began his youth career with Derby City Rovers before joining the Seattle Sounders FC Academy in 2015 while attending Roosevelt High School.  Muse made 32 starts for the Sounders Academy over two seasons and he helped guide the Sounders U-18s to a third-place finish in the 2017 USSDA playoffs. During this time Muse was a member of the U.S. U18 Men's National Team. After high school graduation in 2017 Muse went on to Indiana University. In his freshman season he was named to the Big Ten All-Freshman Team and was the goalkeeper for the runner-up team in the NCAA College Cup. Muse led the NCAA in goals against average (0.26), shutouts (18) and save percentage (90.3 percent). In his sophomore season as part of the Big Ten Championship team and he was named Big Ten Goalkeeper of the Year and was a MAC Hermann semifinalist.

Professional

Seattle Sounders FC
On January 15, 2019 Muse signed the 11th homegrown player contract with Seattle Sounders FC. Following the 2021 season, Seattle declined their contract option on Muse.

San Diego Loyal (loan)
On February 2, 2021, Muse joined USL Championship side San Diego Loyal on loan for the 2021 season.

Loudoun United
On January 28, 2022, Muse signed with USL Championship side Loudoun United.

Memphis 901 (loan)
On March 11, 2022, Muse was loaned to USL Championship side Memphis 901.

Charleston Battery
On December 29, 2022, Muse joined USL Championship side Charleston Battery for their 2023 season.

Honors
Seattle Sounders FC
MLS Cup: 2019

Individual
 2015-2016 USDA Western Conference U-15/16 Goalkeeper of the Year
 2016-2017 USDA Western Conference Goalkeeper of the Year and Western Conference Player of the Year
 2017 Second-Team All-Big Ten and Big Ten All-Freshman Team
 2017 Top Drawer Soccer First-Team Freshman Best XI
 2017 College Soccer News All-Freshman First Team 
 2017 NCAA College Cup All-Tournament Team
 2018 MAC Hermann Trophy Semifinalist 
 2018 Big Ten Goalkeeper of the Year and First-Team All-Big Ten
 2018 First-Team All-America by United Soccer Coaches
 2018 First-Team Best XI by Top Drawer Soccer  
 2018 First-Team All-America by College Soccer News

Personal life
Muse is the son of Dave Muse, a former goalkeeper for the University of Kentucky, and Rachel Hall and has two siblings, Houston and Alexis.

References

External links
 
Indiana Hoosiers bio
U.S. Soccer bio

1999 births
Living people
American soccer players
Association football goalkeepers
Indiana Hoosiers men's soccer players
Derby City Rovers players
Seattle Sounders FC players
Tacoma Defiance players
San Diego Loyal SC players
Loudoun United FC players
Memphis 901 FC players
Charleston Battery players
Soccer players from Louisville, Kentucky
USL League Two players
USL Championship players
United States men's under-20 international soccer players
All-American men's college soccer players
Homegrown Players (MLS)